This is a list of Austrian football transfers for the 2018 summer transfer window. Only transfers featuring Austrian Football Bundesliga are listed.

Austrian Football Bundesliga

Note: Flags indicate national team as has been defined under FIFA eligibility rules. Players may hold more than one non-FIFA nationality.

Admira Wacker Mödling

In:

Out:

Austria Wien

In:

Out:

LASK Linz

In:

Out:

Rapid Wien

In:

Out:

Red Bull Salzburg

In:

Out:

Rheindorf Altach

In:

Out:

St. Pölten

In:

Out:

Sturm Graz

In:

Out:

SV Mattersburg

In:

Out:

TSV Hartberg

In:

Out:

Wacker Innsbruck

In:

Out:

Wolfsberger AC

In:

Out:

See also

 2018–19 Austrian Football Bundesliga

References

External links
 Official site of the ÖFB
 Official site of the Bundesliga

Football transfers summer 2018
Transfers
2018